Dyadic space refers to any space between two objects, see:

  Dyadic space (mathematics)
  Dyadic space (cell biology)